Cecconi is an Italian surname. Notable people with the surname include:

Eugenio Cecconi (1842–1903), Italian painter
Giancarlo Cecconi (born 1935), Italian sport shooter
Luca Cecconi (born 1964), Italian footballer and manager
Luciano Re Cecconi (1948–1977), Italian footballer
Maurizia Cecconi (born 1975), Italian synchronized swimmer
Paolo Cecconi (1953-2016), retired Italian footballer

See also
Monic Cecconi-Botella (born 1936), French pianist, music educator and composer

Italian-language surnames